German submarine U-842 was a Type IXC/40 U-boat built for Nazi Germany's Kriegsmarine during World War II.

U-842 was ordered on 20 January 1941 from DeSchiMAG AG Weser in Bremen under the yard number 1048. Her keel was laid down on 6 April 1942 and the U-boat was launched on 14 November the same year. She was commissioned into service under the command of Kapitänleutnant Wolfgang Heller (Crew 30) in 4th U-boat Flotilla on 1 March 1943.

Design
German Type IXC/40 submarines were slightly larger than the original Type IXCs. U-842 had a displacement of  when at the surface and  while submerged. She had two shafts and two  propellers.

U-842 was fitted with six  torpedo tubes (four fitted at the bow and two at the stern), 22 torpedoes, one  SK C/32 naval gun, 180 rounds, and a  SK C/30 as well as a  C/30 anti-aircraft gun. The boat had a complement of forty-eight.

Service history
Transferred to the 2nd U-boat Flotilla, U-842 left Kiel on 14 September 1943 for Bergen where she arrived three days later. On 5 October 1943. U-842 set out for operations in the North Atlantic, where she joined operations against convoy ONS 20. The U-boat escaped an attack by one of the escorts,  on 17 October unscathed, joining group Siegfried operating against convoy HX 262 on 23 October, and group Siegfried 3 on 26 October. In the final days of October, she was part of group Jahn off Newfoundland. In early November U-842 was among the U-boats of group Tirpitz attacking convoy HX 264, when she was spotted and attacked by an aircraft in the early afternoon of 6 November 1943.

References

Bibliography

External links

World War II submarines of Germany
German Type IX submarines
1942 ships
U-boats commissioned in 1943
Ships built in Bremen (state)
U-boats sunk in 1943
U-boats sunk by British warships
U-boats sunk by depth charges
Ships lost with all hands
Maritime incidents in November 1943